The Anthropological Society of Victoria was formed in 1934, in response to the efforts of gifted lecturer Frederic Wood Jones who attracted an enthusiastic non-academic audience to his public lectures in the 1930s.

In 1976 it amalgamated with the Archaeological Society of Victoria to form the Archaeological and Anthropological Society of Victoria.

References

External links
Official website

Archaeology of Australia
Archaeology
Clubs and societies in Victoria (Australia)
Organizations established in 1934
1934 establishments in Australia